PATE may refer to:
 Pectate disaccharide-lyase, an enzyme
 The ICAO airport code of Teller Airport, Teller, Alaska